Hamberg is a surname. Notable people with the surname include:

Nils Peter Hamberg (1815–1902), Swedish pharmacist, physician and forensic chemist
Piet Hamberg (born 1954), Dutch former footballer and manager
Theodore Hamberg (1819–1854), Swedish missionary in China and author, brother of Nils Hamberg

See also 

 Hamburg (surname)